My Husband in Law (which translates as "Heart Almost Broken, Secretly in Love with My Husband") is a 2020 Thai television series created by Thong Entertainment and directed by Ampaiporn Jitmaingong. It was written by Panathee Suppasaksutat, starring Prin Suparat and Nittha Jirayungyurn. The  drama was aired by Channel 3 on Mondays and Tuesdays at 20:15 (ICT) time slot from April 21 to June 9, 2020. Tencent Video served as the broadcaster in mainland China.

Cast

Starring
 Prin Suparat as Tianrawat Nawanawakun / "Tian"
 Nittha Jirayungyurn as Nateerin Sawatdirat / Nateerin Nawanawakun / "Muey"
 Rachwin Wongviriya as Yada
 Nut Devahastin as Pondech

Supporting
 Yong Armchair as Pariwat Nawanawakun / "Ri"
 Maneerat Sricharoon as Monwatoo Nawanawakun / "Mon"
 Lalana Kongtoranin as Kang
 Kanin Stanley as Kob
 Natthaphong Chatphong as Beer
 Thanakorn Chinakul as Toon
 Witsarut Himmarat as Nut
 Techin Ploypreche as Sed
 Kanidkun Nedbud as Tum
 Pitchapa Phanthumchinda as Nattamon / "Kawfang"
 Duangta Toongkamanee as Kun Nai Sajee Nawanawakun / "Pariwat, Thianwat 's mother"
 Angsana Buranon as Prapa Sawatdirat / "Nateerin 's mother"
 Surasak Chaieid as Tada (Yada 's fother)  
 Tanupong Saktanawad as Satid

Others
 Boromwuti Hiranyatithi as Chad
 Benjawan Artner as Madtana
 Paweenut Pangnakorn as Je’ Kung 
 Chadcharin Klaynak as Baramee
 Yuwadee Riengchay as Prophet
 Jenny Panan as A-Mia (Bamar people) 
 Thongchai Thongkanthom as Mumu (Bamar people) 
 Padtarawadee Pinthong as Kik (Bamar people)  
 Viroj Tangvarnich as Sinsae’ (Prophet)

Ratings 
In the table below,  represents the lowest ratings and  represents the highest ratings.
 N/A denotes that the rating is not known.

Notes

References

External links 
อกเกือบหักแอบรักคุณสามี/My Husband in Law on Channel 3 website 

2020 Thai television series debuts
2020 Thai television series endings
Thai romantic comedy television series
Thai television soap operas
2020s Thai television series
Channel 3 (Thailand) original programming